Karatau Nature Reserve (Qaratau memlekettık tabiği qoryğy) is a wildlife refuge in the mid-part of the Karatau Mountains, near Kyzylkum, Betpak-Dala and Moiynkum deserts in the South Kazakhstan Region of Kazakhstan, in Central Asia.

It was founded in 2004. Its territory is around 34 300 ha. Some 700 species of plants constitute its flora, 62 species are endemic. Its fauna includes, among others, the Kara Tau argali, Indian crested porcupine and beech marten. There are 118 bird species in the area.

External links

Karatau Nature Reserve 
Karatau Nature Reserve official site (in Russian)
Description (in Russian)
Flora of the Karatau Nature Reserve 

Nature reserves in Kazakhstan
Turkistan Region
Protected areas established in 2004
2004 establishments in Kazakhstan